The Vääna is a river in northwestern Estonia. Its mouth is in Vääna-Jõesuu, Harku Parish. The length of the river is 69.5 km.

Gallery

References

External links

Rivers of Estonia
Harku Parish